Shahyar Ghanbari ( also spelled wrongly as Shahryar Ghanbari , born 28 July 1950 in Tehran) is an Iranian poet, writer, lyricist, songwriter, and singer of Persian pop music. He is also a film director & radio-TV producer .

Shahyar is the son of Hamid Ghanbari, an Iranian actor, dubber and singer. He writes and sings in Persian, English and French. His songs typically feature love, solitude, and nostalgia. He currently lives in the United States.

Studio albums 

 IF (1981)
 The Earthless Tree (1991)
 Forbidden (1992)
 Travelog (1994)
 Nakedness (1998)
 Forbidden Plus (1999)
 I Love You’s (2001)
 Rewind Me in Paris (2003)
 Reborn (2010)
 Les Coeurages (2011)
 The Milky Voice(La Voix Lacté) (2016)

Filmography 
 Iran - sous le voile des apparences (2003), Composer
Sham-e akhar : The Last Supper - (1976), Director and Writer
Khane-kharab (1975), Actor
Khodahafez Rafigh (1971), Songwriter
Subah-O-Shaam (1971), Songwriter for Persian version

Books
 The Sea In Me (1995) Derakhte Bi Zamin (1991)'' / The Earth-less  TREE
 Goftan baraye ZIBA shodan / Dire pour devenir plus beau
 Shahyar's LEONARD 
 Benevis, Saat e paknevis / MASTERING TIME

See also
Ardalan Sarfaraz

References

External links

1950 births
Living people
20th-century Iranian male actors
Iranian film directors
Iranian film score composers
Iranian lyricists
20th-century Iranian male singers
Iranian pop singers
Iranian songwriters
People from Tehran
Exiles of the Iranian Revolution in the United States
Iranian male film actors
Male film score composers
Iranian radio and television presenters